HMS Brisk has been the name of more than one ship of the British Royal Navy, and may refer to:

 , a 16-gun sloop launched in 1784 and sold in 1805
 , an 18-gun sloop launched in 1805 and sold in 1816
 , a 10-gun  launched in 1819 and sold in 1843
 , a steam sloop launched in 1851 and sold in 1870
 , a torpedo cruiser launched in 1886 and sold in 1906
 , a destroyer launched in 1910 and sold in 1921

Royal Navy ship names